Giorgi Sogoiani (born 7 July 1997) is a Georgian luger. He competed in the 2018 Winter Olympics.

References

External links
 

1997 births
Living people
Lugers at the 2018 Winter Olympics
Male lugers from Georgia (country)
Olympic lugers of Georgia (country)